Carl William Dunn Kirkwood (30 April 1929 – 26 March 2020) was a Scottish-born Australian former politician.

He was born in Denny to jobbing iron moulder William Kirkwood and his wife Ellen. He completed his schooling in Scotland and then served in the British Army in Malaya and Singapore from 1946 to 1948. He worked as a jobbing moulder, coming to Australia in 1955. He was soon active both in the Moulders' Union and the Labor Party's Preston branch. In 1970 he was elected to the Victorian Legislative Assembly as the member for Preston. He became spokesman on local government immediately, adding lands from 1976 to 1977 and dropping his frontbench role entirely in 1981. Kirkwood retired in 1988.

References

1929 births
2020 deaths
Australian Labor Party members of the Parliament of Victoria
Members of the Victorian Legislative Assembly
People from Denny, Falkirk
Scottish emigrants to Australia
British Army personnel